is a retired Japanese sprinter turned bobsledder who represented his country at the 1988 Summer Olympics and 1998 Winter Olympics. He is the first and only Japanese male athlete to compete in both the Summer and Winter Olympic games (As of 2020). During his athletics career he also competed at two World Indoor Championships, in 1989 and 1993. He was the former national record holder in the 100 metres and the first Japanese to run under 10.3 seconds. He is currently the deputy director of track and field club at Chukyo University.

Athletics career

International competitions

National titles
Japanese Championships
100 metres: 1989
4 × 100 metres relay: 1987

Personal bests
Outdoor
100 metres – 10.28 (+1.4 m/s, Tokyo 1988): Former national record

Indoor
60 metres – 6.76 (Budapest 1989)

Bobsleigh career

International competitions

References

External links

All-Athletics profile (archived)
Rights Company profile 
Profile at JOC 

1967 births
Living people
People from Wakayama (city)
Sportspeople from Wakayama Prefecture
Japanese male sprinters
Japanese male bobsledders
Japanese athletics coaches
Olympic male sprinters
Olympic athletes of Japan
Athletes (track and field) at the 1988 Summer Olympics
Athletes (track and field) at the 1992 Summer Olympics
Olympic bobsledders of Japan
Bobsledders at the 1998 Winter Olympics
Asian Games bronze medalists for Japan
Asian Games medalists in athletics (track and field)
Athletes (track and field) at the 1990 Asian Games
Medalists at the 1990 Asian Games
Universiade bronze medalists for Japan
Universiade medalists in athletics (track and field)
Medalists at the 1987 Summer Universiade
Japan Championships in Athletics winners
Chukyo University alumni
20th-century Japanese people